Durab-e Olya-ye Jadid (also Romanized as Dūrāb-e ‘Olyā-ye Jadīd; also known as Dūrāb-e ‘Olyā) is a village in Bahmai-ye Garmsiri-ye Shomali Rural District, Bahmai-ye Garmsiri District, Bahmai County, Kohgiluyeh and Boyer-Ahmad Province, Iran. At the 2006 census, its population was 81, in 20 families.

References 

Populated places in Bahmai County